Route 324 is a collector road in the Canadian province of Nova Scotia.

The road is located in Lunenburg County and connects Blockhouse at Highway 103 with Lunenburg at Trunk 3.

Communities
Lunenburg
Lilydale
Northwest
Fauxburg
Blockhouse

Parks
Second Peninsula Provincial Park

Museum
Lunenburg Fisheries Museum of the Atlantic

See also
List of Nova Scotia provincial highways

References

Map of Nova Scotia

Nova Scotia provincial highways
Roads in Lunenburg County, Nova Scotia